Akvelīna Līvmane (born 13 July 1951, in Dubna Parish) is a Latvian actress  and astrologer. She received the Lielais Kristaps award for Best Actress in 2005.

References

1951 births
Latvian film actresses
Living people
Lielais Kristaps Award winners
People from Daugavpils Municipality